= Skyuka Spring =

Spring in Georgia, United States

Coordinates: 34°58′10.04″N 85°23′18.39″W

Skyuka Spring is a spring in the U.S. state of Georgia.

Skyuka Spring was named after Skyuka/Wyuca, a Cherokee chieftain.
